The 1914 Middle Tennessee State Normal football team represented the Middle Tennessee State Normal School (now known as Middle Tennessee State University) during the 1914 college football season. The team captain was W. E. Ragland.

Schedule

References

Middle Tennessee State Normal
Middle Tennessee Blue Raiders football seasons
College football undefeated seasons
Middle Tennessee State Normal football